Alain Deneef (born 26 March 1960) is a Belgian entrepreneur.

As an expert in urban issues and civil society, he is the founder and president of Aula Magna. He helped to launch the Citizen’s Forum of Brussels. This endeavour won the Flemish :nl: Prijs voor de Democratie in July 2010. Within Aula Magna he organized the first Brussels Citizens University (2010). Four Brussels Summer Universities have followed since then on a yearly basis.

As businessman, he has held top management positions in Canal+ Belgium (now BeTV (Belgium)), Belgacom and the SNCB - the Belgian railway company, among others, and several positions as director in BT Belgium, CIT Blaton and Carmeuse.

He has been intendant of Brussels Metropolitan.

A strategic consultant, he helps medium and large organizations foresee the impact of technological, financial, social, demographic, environmental, urban and political change on their future. On this basis, he offers his expertise to Up4North, an association of property owners of the Northern area, aiming to reinvigorate this business district in Brussels.

He has served as president of a number of clubs and associations amongst which the Alumni association of the Collège Saint-Michel (Bruxelles). Since August 2013, he is the president of the World Union of Jesuit Alumni (WUJA). He was also president of the Brussels chapter of the Young Presidents' Organization (YPO) and is currently a member of the World Presidents' Organizsation (WPO).

He is the Executive Officer of the European Quarter Fund. He is also involved as president in the European Quarter Area Management Association (EQuAMA). 

In the sport field, he is the Secretary General of the European Sports Academy (ESA). He is further a director of the Brussels Studies Institute.

He founded a publishing company, Prosopon Editions.

He was educated at the Université Libre de Bruxelles (ULB), where he obtained the degrees of Business Engineer (Solvay Brussels School of Economics and Management) and Law and Philosophy (1984). More recently, also a Master in History at the same university. He is fluent in Dutch, English, French and German. He lives in Ixelles (Brussels Region).

References
 On Brussels Metropolitan: Article in La Libre
 On urban issues: Interview in Brussel Deze Week
 On the new Brussels civil’s society: Publication on "Le nouveau mouvement bruxellois"
 On the jesuits in Brussels and in the world: Interview on Télé-Bruxelles

Living people
Belgian businesspeople
Université libre de Bruxelles alumni
1960 births